Edadus was a legendary king of the Britons as recounted by Geoffrey of Monmouth in his Historia Regum Britanniae. He was the second son of King Cherin and succeeded by his brother Andragius.

References

2nd-century BC legendary rulers
Legendary British kings